Eleocharis macrostachya is a species of spikesedge known by the common name pale spikerush.

It is widely distributed in North America and occurs in parts of South America. It is a plant of varied moist habitats, including freshwater lakes and brackish marshes and ponds, ditches, vernal pools, and wet meadows.

Description
Eleocharis macrostachya is a rhizomatous perennial generally reaching heights between one half and one meter. It has bright green erect stems and straw-colored basal leaves. The top of each stem is occupied by a narrow, lance-shaped or cylindrical inflorescence. The spikelet is one or two centimeters long and has at least ten flowers, each covered with a purplish-brown bract. The fruit is a yellow or yellow-brown achene with a whitish cone-shaped tubercle on one end, measuring one or two millimeters long.

Use in phytoremediation efforts 
E. macrostachya has been studied as part of wetland restoration, as well as the removal of arsenic in groundwater via rhizofiltration as part of phytoremediation. Wetlands have the capacity to remove many conventional contaminants from wastewater, even in highly saline water. Olmos-Marquez (2012) identified E. macrostachya as having the greatest arsenic retention in an experimental wetland, suggesting that it acts as a rhizofiltrator.

References

External links
Jepson Manual Treatment: Eleocharis macrostachya
USDA Plants Profile — Eleocharis macrostachya (pale spikerush)
Eleocharis macrostachya — U.C. Photo gallery
C.Michael Hogan ed. 2010. Eleocharis macrostachya. Encyclopedia of Life

macrostachya
Freshwater plants
Brackish water plants
Flora of North America
Flora of Central America
Flora of South America
Flora of the United States
Plants described in 1903
Phytoremediation plants